Soběhrdy is a municipality and village in Benešov District in the Central Bohemian Region of the Czech Republic. It has about 400 inhabitants.

Administrative parts
Villages of Mezihoří, Phov, Žíňánky and Žíňany are administrative parts of Soběhrdy.

History
The first written mention of Soběhrdy is from 1360.

References

Villages in Benešov District